The posterior cord is a part of the brachial plexus.  It consists of contributions from all of the roots of the brachial plexus.

The posterior cord gives rise to the following nerves:

Additional images

References

MBBS resources 
http://mbbsbasic.googlepages.com/

External links
  - "Axilla, dissection, anterior view"

Nerves of the upper limb